2016 Women's Bandy World Championship is held in Roseville, Minnesota, USA, on February 18–21, 2016. The Guidant John Rose Minnesota Oval hosts the games.

This is the eighth Women's Bandy World Championship and the second Women's Bandy World Championship hosted by the United States. China made its championship debut.

Sweden had won all the previous Women's World Championships of bandy except the last one in 2014, which was won by Russia. The Swedes responded this year by defeating the Russians in the final by 1 goal to 0.

Participating teams

Venue

Tournament

Preliminary round

Standings

Games
All times local (UTC -6)

Knock-out stage

Semi-finals

Third-place game

Final

Consolation tournament

Fifth place game

Broadcasting
The games were broadcast online by Perfect Storm Broadcasting.

References

 
2016 in American women's sports
2016 in sports in Minnesota
February 2016 sports events in the United States
International bandy competitions hosted by the United States
Roseville, Minnesota
2016
Sports competitions in Minnesota